Kai Holm (4 March 1896 – 10 July 1985) was a Danish film actor. He appeared in 41 films between 1927 and 1979. He was born in Lemvig, Denmark and died in Denmark.

Filmography

Vester Vov-Vov - 1927
Tordenstenene - 1927
Hallo! Afrika forude! - 1929
Præsten i Vejlby - 1931
Kirke og orgel - 1932
Nøddebo Præstegård - 1934
 Flight from the Millions - 1934
Snushanerne - 1936
Inkognito - 1937
Livet på Hegnsgaard - 1938
Kongen bød - 1938
Sørensen og Rasmussen - 1940
I de gode gamle dage - 1940
Sommerglæder - 1940
Tordenskjold går i land - 1942
Forellen - 1942
Ditte Menneskebarn - 1946
For frihed og ret - 1949
Vesterhavsdrenge - 1950
The Old Mill on Mols - 1953
Kongeligt besøg - 1954
Karen, Maren og Mette - 1954
Altid ballade - 1955
Kristiane af Marstal - 1956
Seksdagesløbet - 1958
Det tossede paradis - 1962
Støvsugerbanden - 1963
Don Olsen kommer til byen - 1964
Døden kommer til middag - 1964
Flådens friske fyre - 1965
Der var engang - 1966
Elsk din næste - 1967
Nyhavns glade gutter - 1967
Takt og tone i himmelsengen - 1972
På'en igen Amalie - 1973
Bejleren - en jysk røverhistorie - 1975
Drømme støjer ikke når de dør - 1979

External links

1896 births
1985 deaths
Danish male film actors
Danish male silent film actors
20th-century Danish male actors
People from Lemvig